Howard Francis Stone (born May 25, 1931) is a retired lieutenant general in the United States Army. He was Commandant of the United States Army Command and General Staff College from August 24, 1981 to June 25, 1982. He later served as Chief of Staff of the United States European Command. Stone received a B.S. degree from the United States Military Academy in 1955 and later earned an M.A. degree in public administration from the University of Oklahoma.

References

1931 births
Living people
People from Monett, Missouri
United States Military Academy alumni
American Senior Army Aviators
United States Army personnel of the Vietnam War
Recipients of the Air Medal
Recipients of the Distinguished Flying Cross (United States)
Recipients of the Silver Star
University of Oklahoma alumni
Recipients of the Legion of Merit
United States Army generals